Stefano Lodovichi (born 31 August 1983) is an Italian film director and screenwriter.

Career
He started his career directing short-films and music videos, and collaborating as assistant director with Carlo Virzì, Francesco Falaschi and Rolando Colla.

His first feature film Aquadro, a Rai Cinema co-production, was released in 2013. Lodovichi wrote and directed the Sky Cinema thriller film Deep in the Wood, released in theatres on 19 November 2015. His other works include Rai 2 crime series Cacciatore: The Hunter (2018) and Mediaset courtroom drama The Trial (2019).

In 2019 he married actress Camilla Filippi.

Filmography

Feature films
Aquadro (2013)
Deep in the Wood (2015)
The Guest Room (2021)

TV series
Cacciatore: The Hunter (2018)
The Trial (2019)
Christian (2022)

Short films
No End (2007)
Due di tre (2009)
Il pranzo di Natale – segment Figli di Dio (2011)

Music videos
 "Libera romantica", Bohemia (2009)
 "Sweet Aroma", Quartiere Coffee (2010)
 "Uan", Formiche nell'Orto (2010)
 "This Is Not a Test", Lapingra (2011)
 "Pamphlet", Carlot-ta (2011)
 "Caffeine", Quartiere Coffee (2011)
 "Solo un disegno circolare", Lapingra (2012)
 "La paura", Gran Turismo Veloce (2013)
 "Vertical Love", Beatrice Antolini (2013)
 "A denti stretti", Mondo Marcio (2014)

References

External links

1983 births
Living people
Italian film directors
Italian screenwriters
People from Grosseto
Italian male screenwriters